The Ambassador Extraordinary and Plenipotentiary of the Russian Federation to Yugoslavia was the official representative of the President and the Government of the Russian Federation to the President and the Government of Yugoslavia.

The position of Soviet ambassador to Yugoslavia lasted from the first establishment of relations between the Soviet Union and the Kingdom of Yugoslavia in 1940, until the dissolution of the Soviet Union in 1991. This encompassed the period of the Yugoslav government-in-exile between 1941 and 1945, and the establishment of the Federal People's Republic of Yugoslavia in 1945. Relations were briefly broken off between 1949 and 1953, and continued thereafter, including after the renaming of the state as the Socialist Federal Republic of Yugoslavia from 1963 until 1992. Representation was maintained between the Socialist Federal Republic of Yugoslavia and the Soviet Union's successor, the Russian Federation, until the breakup of Yugoslavia in 1992. Thereafter the Russian Federation maintained relations with many of Yugoslavia's successor states, including Serbia and Montenegro, otherwise known as the Federal Republic of Yugoslavia between 1992 and 2003, and the State Union of Serbia and Montenegro from 2003 and 2006. After the separation of this union into the independent countries of Serbia and Montenegro in 2006, the Russian Federation continues to appoint representatives to both of them.

History of diplomatic relations

Diplomatic exchanges between the Soviet Union and Yugoslavia began with the formal establishment of relations on 24 June 1940, towards the very end of the existence of the Kingdom of Yugoslavia, and shortly before its invasion and occupation by Axis forces the following year. The first Soviet representative, was appointed on 26 June 1940, and presented his credentials on 12 July 1940. With the invasion and occupation of Yugoslavia in 1941, a Yugoslav government-in-exile was established, eventually settling in London. The  , representative to many of the governments-in-exile that were based in London during the occupation of their countries, was accredited to the Yugoslav government-in-exile from 21 August 1941 onwards. During the war, power shifted to the hands of the Partisan movement, led by Josip Broz Tito, and with the expulsion of Axis forces towards the end of the war, Tito formed a government to which the Soviet Union duly accredited  as its first ambassador. Sadchikov was succeeded by Anatoly Lavrentiev in 1946, but relations between Titov and Stalin soured during the second half of the 1940s, and diplomatic relations were broken off in 1949. They were only restored in 1953 following Stalin's death in March that year, and in June 1953 Vasily Valkov was appointed the new Soviet ambassador. Relations were maintained thereafter, including during the changing of the country's name to the Socialist Federal Republic of Yugoslavia in 1963, with the last Soviet ambassador, Gennady Shikin, being appointed in September 1991. With the dissolution of the Soviet Union in December 1991, Shikin remained as ambassador of the Russian Federation, and continued to serve during the breakup of Yugoslavia in 1992.

With the breakup of Yugoslavia, many of the former constituent republics declared independence and established themselves as separate nations. The Russian Federation duly established relations and appointed ambassadors to them: to Croatia in 1992, to Slovenia in 1994, to Bosnia and Herzegovina and to Macedonia in 1996. The former republics of Serbia and Montenegro combined to form the Federal Republic of Yugoslavia in 1992, and Shikin continued as ambassador in Belgrade to this state until 1996. In 2003 the Federal Republic of Yugoslavia was officially renamed the State Union of Serbia and Montenegro, and three years later was dissolved to form the separate states of Serbia, and Montenegro. The incumbent ambassador to Serbia and Montenegro, continued as ambassador to Serbia, while a new ambassador, was appointed ambassador to Montenegro in 2007.

List of representatives (1940– 1992)

Representatives of the Soviet Union to the Kingdom of Yugoslavia (1940 – 1941)

Representatives of the Soviet Union to the Yugoslav government-in-exile (1941 – 1945)

Representatives of the Soviet Union to the Federal People's Republic of Yugoslavia (1945 – 1963)

Representatives of the Soviet Union to the Socialist Federal Republic of Yugoslavia (1963 – 1991)

Representatives of the Russian Federation to the Socialist Federal Republic of Yugoslavia (1991 – 1992)

Representatives of the Russian Federation to the Federal Republic of Yugoslavia (1992 – 2003)

Representatives of the Russian Federation to Serbia and Montenegro (2003 – 2006)

Appointment of representatives to successor nations

References

 
 
Yugoslavia
Russia